Sahar Biniaz (born November 17, 1987) is an Iranian-Canadian actress, model and beauty pageant titleholder who won Miss Universe Canada 2012. She had a recurring role on the hit TV show Sanctuary as the Hindu goddess of power Kali.

Biography 
Biniaz was born in Bangalore, Karnataka, India to an Iranian family. She grew up in Iran, and a few years later, her family moved to Vancouver, Canada, where she became a naturalized Canadian. She graduated with honors from the Stella Adler Studio of Acting School in Los Angeles.

Pageant history
Biniaz competed in the Miss Universe Canada 2003 pageant where she did not place. She went on to compete in beauty pageants representing Canada, including winning 1st runner-up in Miss Universe Canada 2008. Four years later, she competed in the same pageant and won the title of "Miss Universe Canada 2012". She also won the Revlon Professional Best Hair award.

Personal causes

At the age of 14, Biniaz was mauled by a family pit bull. "The Richmond resident was the victim of a pit bull attack herself at the age of 14, a year after her family adopted a five-month-old pit bull from a breeder. The pit bull 'came from a really nice environment', she said, but 'then I ended up getting 16 stitches. Biniaz still bears the scars on her chest to this day."

As a result of being a pit bull victim, in 2012, she decided to join the fight for pit bull controls and "plans to make the effort a major part of her [Miss Universe Canada] reign... noting that with her Miss Universe Canada title she now has a voice to bring more awareness to this issue."

She consequently became the object of vitriol from pit bull advocates, who lobbied the Miss Universe organization to strip her of her title for speaking out. Some pit bull advocates accused her of not really being Canadian and not representing Canadian values.

Filmography

References

External links
 Miss Universe Canada
 Sahar Biniaz Official Site – The Official Sahar Biniaz Website
 

1986 births
Living people
Canadian people of Indian descent
Canadian people of Iranian descent
Miss Tourism International delegates
Actresses from Vancouver
Canadian beauty pageant winners
Iranian female models
People from Bangalore